Chris Harris (born August 6, 1982) is an American football coach and former safety who is the defensive pass game coordinator and cornerbacks coach for the Tennessee Titans of the National Football League (NFL). He was drafted by the Chicago Bears in the sixth round of the 2005 NFL Draft after playing college football for the University of Louisiana at Monroe.

Harris also played with the Carolina Panthers, Detroit Lions, and Jacksonville Jaguars, and has coached with the Bears, San Diego / Los Angeles Chargers, and Washington Commanders.

College career
Harris attended college at Louisiana-Monroe. After redshirting the 2000 season, he was a four-year starter from 2001 to 2004.

Professional career

Chicago Bears Bears
Harris was drafted by the Chicago Bears in the sixth round (181st overall) of the 2005 NFL Draft. He won the starting role at free safety early during his rookie season. In the 2006 preseason, Harris made a statement to a fan, Bryan Lange, that if the Bears made the Super Bowl he would give him a ticket. In January, his statement caused a minor controversy when the Bears did in fact qualify for Super Bowl XLI. Lange stood outside of Bears team headquarters holding a sign saying "Chris Harris, you promised." Harris claimed that he was joking and would not be able to fulfill the request due to family ticket obligations. Ticket brokerage firm sitclose.com later gave Lange a ticket, quieting the controversy. Harris intercepted a pass from Colts quarterback Peyton Manning in the first quarter of the game; however, the Bears would go on to lose the game 29–17.

Carolina Panthers
Harris was traded to the Carolina Panthers on August 2, 2007 for a 2008 5th round draft pick. Harris started 15 games in 2007 finishing with 101 tackles, and also setting a team record as he led the league with eight forced fumbles.

In 2008, the Panthers rewarded Harris with a four-year contract extension. He finished the 2008 season with 70 tackles, 2 forced fumbles, and 1 interception.

Chicago Bears (second stint)
On April 27, 2010, Harris was dealt back to the Bears in exchange for linebacker Jamar Williams. In his first season back in Chicago, Harris recorded 70 tackles and a career-high five interceptions that he returned for 69 yards. In week 12, he was the first player of the season to intercept a Michael Vick pass as he picked off Vick in Chicago's end zone to help the Bears beat the Eagles 31–26. Following his performance during the 2010 season, Harris received his first All-Pro-selection. On October 27, 2011, Harris was released by the Bears.

Detroit Lions
The Detroit Lions claimed him off waivers on October 28, 2011.

Jacksonville Jaguars
Harris was signed by the Jacksonville Jaguars on October 15, 2012. He was later released on November 28.

On January 26, 2013, Harris announced his retirement.

Coaching career

Chicago Bears
On January 28, 2013 Harris was hired by the Bears as a defensive quality control coach. He was not retained by new Bears head coach John Fox in 2015.

San Diego / Los Angeles Chargers
Harris joined the San Diego Chargers as their assistant defensive backs coach in 2016.

Washington Football Team / Commanders
Harris joined the Washington Football Team as their defensive backs coach in 2020.

Tennessee Titans
In 2023, Harris joined the Tennessee Titans as their defensive pass game coordinator and cornerbacks coach.

References

External links
Tennessee Titans profile

1982 births
Living people
Sportspeople from Little Rock, Arkansas
Players of American football from Arkansas
American football safeties
Louisiana–Monroe Warhawks football players
Chicago Bears players
Carolina Panthers players
Detroit Lions players
Jacksonville Jaguars players
San Diego Chargers coaches
Tennessee Titans coaches
Los Angeles Chargers coaches
Washington Commanders coaches
Washington Football Team coaches
Brian Piccolo Award winners